Generations is an American soap opera that aired on NBC from March 27, 1989, to January 25, 1991. The show was groundbreaking in that it was the first soap opera to feature from its inception an African-American family.

Premise
This half-hour serial was promoted as television's first fully integrated daytime soap. It focused on the relationship between two Chicago families: the Whitmores and the Marshalls. Their association began several decades ago when Vivian Potter (Lynn Hamilton) was housekeeper and nanny for Rebecca Whitmore and her three children: Laura (Gail Ramsey), Stephanie (nicknamed Sam) (Kelly Rutherford), and J.D. Vivian's young daughter, Ruth (Joan Pringle) lived with her in the Whitmore mansion.

When Ruth grew up, she married Henry Marshall (Taurean Blacque, James Reynolds), who owned and operated five moderately successful ice cream parlors. With Ruth's urging, Henry enlisted the help of business mogul Martin Jackson (Rick Fitts), who marketed Marshall's ice cream nationwide. The move proved so successful that Ruth was able to buy the Whitmore mansion. Ruth and Henry had three children, Chantal (Sharon Brown, Debbi Morgan), a lawyer, Jacquelyn Marshall Rhymes, a homemaker and mother, and Adam (Kristoff St. John), a junior executive with the Hale Hotel chain. Living with the Marshalls was Ruth's mother, Vivian (Lynn Hamilton). Sam, Monique and Adam were all childhood friends who grew up together.

Like Ruth Marshall, Rebecca Whitmore (Pat Crowley; Dorothy Lyman) also had a challenging past to overcome. Unknown to Rebecca, her ex-husband Peter (Ron Harper) stole her inheritance, and abandoned her. Determined to move forward with her life, a middle-aged Rebecca enrolled in law school and succeeded in becoming one of the nation's leading attorneys. When the serial premiered, her daughter Laura was married to advertising executive Trevor McCallum. Realizing that Trevor was cheating on her, Laura ended the marriage. They had an adult daughter, Monique (Nancy Sorel).

Although Rebecca was saddened by the break-up of her oldest daughter's marriage, she was happy to see her granddaughter, Monique, marry photographer Jason Craig. Soon after their marriage, Jason inherited a multimillion dollar fortune, making him a murder target for his mother's crazy aunt, Mary Gardner. Monique's aunt, Sam accepted a position as model and spokesperson for the upscale Hale Hotel chain after leaving college. Sam was a seductive, slightly promiscuous young woman initially, and was having an affair with one of her college professors, Rob Donnelly (George Deloy). As time went on however, Sam matured into a warmer, more responsible person and became one of the show's most popular characters. Sam's boss, the dastardly Jordan Hale, expressed an interest in Sam that went beyond business. Police detective Kyle Masters (Robert Torti) was also wildly attracted to Sam.

Doreen Jackson (Jonelle Allen), a recovering drug addict, was married to Martin Jackson. Following a brief fling with Adam Marshall, Doreen found herself pregnant. Before their daughter, Danielle, was born, the relationship died. When he discovered the affair, a vengeful Martin tried to destroy Adam's life, but Doreen gathered damning evidence against Martin and his numerous ruthless business dealings over the years and threatened to expose him if he ever tried to harm Adam again. She would eventually use that information to help Henry and Ruth drive Martin out of the country when he tried to take over Marshall's Ice Cream. Martin kidnapped Danielle, attempting to flee with her, but Adam and Sam stopped him and he was forced to leave without her to save himself. However, Martin had a videotape of him revealing Danielle'a true parentage sent to the Marshalls shortly afterward. The family was shocked over the revelation and Ruth, furious at being deceived, cut Doreen out of her life, devastating her. The rest of the family urged Ruth to forgive Doreen, reminding her that destroying their friendship with her was giving Martin exactly what he wanted. After an emotional conversation with Doreen, Ruth realized just how difficult it had been for her to keep Danielle's secret for so long and they reconciled. Doreen next took up with her doctor, Daniel Reubens (Richard Roundtree). He resurfaced in Chicago in 1990 with his daughter, Maya Davis – alias Diana Reubens (Vivica A. Fox) – after falsely being accused of killing his wife.

Original cast
 Marla Adams (Helen Mullin)
 Anthony Addabbo (Jason Craig)
 Jonelle Allen (Doreen Jackson)
 Jack Betts (Hugh Gardner)
 Taurean Blacque/James Reynolds (Henry Marshall)
 Sharon Brown/Debbi Morgan (Chantal Marshall)
 Patricia Crowley/Dorothy Lyman (Rebecca Whitmore)
 George Deloy (Rob Donnelly)
 Elinor Donahue (Sylvia Furth)
 Rick Fitts (Martin Jackson)
 Vivica A. Fox (Maya Reubens)
 Bruce Gray (Phillip Webb)
 Lynn Hamilton (Vivian Potter)
 Ron Harper (Peter Whitmore)
 Andrew Masset (Trevor McCallum)
 Joan Pringle (Ruth Marshall)
 Gail Ramsey (Laura McCallum)
 Barbara Rhoades/Linda Gibboney (Jessica Gardner)
 Richard Roundtree (Dr. Daniel Ruebens)
 Kelly Rutherford (Stephanie "Sam" Whitmore)
 George Shannon /Robert Gentry (Jordan Hale)
 Nancy Sorel (Monique McCallum)
 Kristoff St. John (Adam Marshall)
 Robert Torti (Lt. Kyle Masters)
 Joseph Whipp (Charles Mullin)

Production
Sally Sussman Morina served as creator and executive producer. Directors included Casey Childs, Michael Eilbaum, and Maria Wagner. The series was written by Sally Sussman Morina and Michelle Val Jean.

Ratings

 1988–89 season: 2.7 rating (Ranking: #12 out of 13 soap operas)
 1989–90 season: 2.6 rating (Ranking: #12 out of 12 soap operas)
 1990–91 season: 2.4 rating (Ranking: #12 out of 12 soap operas)
 Final week ratings (January 21-25, 1991): 2.7 rating/8 share (12th out of 12), against Loving (3.2 rating/10 share, 11th) and The Young and the Restless (8.4 rating/26 share, 1st)

Awards
 1990 Soap Opera Digest Awards for Outstanding Daytime Serial Nomination
 1990 Creative Arts Emmy Award for Outstanding Graphics and Title Design Win
 1990 Daytime Emmy Award for Outstanding Supporting Actor in a Drama Series (Kristoff St. John) Nomination
 1990 Creative Arts Emmy Award for Outstanding Achievement in Art Direction/Set Decoration/Scenic Design for a Drama Series Nomination
 1990 Creative Arts Emmy Award for Outstanding Achievement in Hairstyling for a Drama Series Nomination
 1990 Creative Arts Emmy Award for Outstanding Achievement in Technical Direction/Electronic Camera/Video Control for a Drama Series Nomination 
 1990 Soap Opera Digest Award for Outstanding Daytime Serial Nomination
 1991 Daytime Emmy Award for Outstanding Lead Actor in a Drama Series (James Reynolds) Nomination
 1991 Daytime Emmy Award for Outstanding Younger Actor in a Drama Series (Kristoff St. John) Nomination
 1991 Soap Opera Digest Award for Outstanding Daytime Soap Nomination
 1991 Soap Opera Digest Award for Outstanding Heroine: Daytime (Kelly Rutherford) Nomination
 1991 Soap Opera Digest Award for Outstanding Male Newcomer: Daytime (Robert Torti) Nomination
 1991 Soap Opera Digest Award for Outstanding Supporting Actor: Daytime (Richard Roundtree) Nomination
 1991 Soap Opera Digest Award for Outstanding Supporting Actress: Daytime (Joan Pringle) Nomination
 1992 Soap Opera Digest Award for Best Love Story: Daytime or Prime Time  Kyle and Sam  Nomination
 1992 Soap Opera Digest Award for Outstanding Daytime Serial Nomination 
 1992 Soap Opera Digest Award for Outstanding Villain: Daytime (Robert Gentry) Nomination

References

External links
  

1989 American television series debuts
1991 American television series endings
1980s American drama television series
1990s American drama television series
American television soap operas
English-language television shows
NBC original programming
Television series by Universal Television
Television shows set in Chicago
NBC network soap operas